Racing Club de Madrid is a defunct Spanish football team from the neighbourhood of Chamberí in Madrid. They competed in the inaugural 1929 Segunda División.

History
Racing Club de Madrid was founded in 1914 by a merger of two Madrid clubs, Instituto Cardenal Cisneros and Regional FC, and joined the Federación Castellana in 1915. They played in the top division of the Campeonato Regional Centro, attempting to qualify for the Copa del Rey which at that time was the national championship. They won the Centro Championship in 1915 and 1919, but were unable to play in the 1915 Copa del Rey due to not having completed the registration process earlier in the year. In the 1919 Copa, Racing lost to eventual winners Arenas Club de Getxo after a replay.

The club disbanded in 1932. Its successor was AR Chamberí.

Season to season

1 season in Segunda División

Honours 
Campeonato Regional Centro: 1915, 1919

References 

Association football clubs established in 1914
Association football clubs disestablished in 1932
Defunct football clubs in the Community of Madrid
Football clubs in Madrid
1914 establishments in Spain
1932 disestablishments in Spain
Segunda División clubs